The light novel series Lord Marksman and Vanadis is written by Tsukasa Kawaguchi and illustrated by Yoshi☆o and Hinata Katagiri. It has been published by Media Factory since April 25, 2011 under their MF Bunko J imprint. The series follows Tigrevurmud Vorn who is a nobleman from Brune. He is captured by Eleonora Viltaria. Eleonora is a beautiful white-haired girl who is one of the seven Vanadis and lord of Leitmeritz. He is later recruited by Elen to help end a civil war between Brune and its neighboring countries to maintain dominance. The first volume of Lord Marksman and Vanadis was released by Media Factory on April 25, 2011. As of November 25, 2017, eighteen volumes have been released under the MF Bunko J imprint. Since its release, Lord Marksman and Vanadis has sold over 800,000 copies in Japan.

The series is split into three separate arcs. The first arc covers the civil war between Brune and Zhcted. It consists of the first five volumes even though Kawaguchi did not confirm which name he should use when writing the sixth volume. The second arc consists of volumes five though ten. The third arc, beginning with volume 11, is the current arc of Lord Marksman and Vanadis and will conclude with the 15th volume.

Volume list

See also
 Lord Marksman and Vanadis characters
 Lord Marksman and Vanadis episodes

References

Lord Marksman and Vanadis
L